Biella Nuei is a Spanish folk music group from Aragón.

Discography
 Las Aves y las Flores (1994)
 Solombra (1998)
 Sol d'ibierno (2006)
 Romper el muro (2011)

References

External links
  
 

Spanish folk music groups
Aragonese culture